Alderano Cybo (sometimes Alderano Cibo or Alderano Cybo-Malaspina) (16 July 1613 – 22 July 1700) was an Italian Catholic Cardinal. He served as the Secretary of State of Pope Innocent XI.

Early life

Cybo was born 16 July 1613 in Genoa, the fifth of fourteen children of Carlo I Cybo-Malaspina, sovereign Prince of Massa and Carrara, and of Brigida Spinola (1587–1660), the daughter of the Marchese di Calice, Giannettino Spinola.

As was the custom in his family (he was descended from Pope Innocent VIII and, through his grandmother Marfisa d'Este, from Pope Alexander VI, and was probably Cardinal Innocenzo Cybo's adulterous great-great-grandson), Alderano and several of his siblings were destined for ecclesiastical careers. His elder sister , on the other hand, was married to the Florentine nobleman Jacopo Salviati, but was involved in an obscure episode in 1633, when she was alleged to be behind the savage murder of Caterina Brogi, Jacopo's mistress, whose head was delivered to him in a basket. Veronica was repudiated by her family, but their pressures on Medici government managed to prevent her being prosecuted for the murder. She was forced to leave Florence and to retire to the countryside, near Figline, in the Salviati's . Later she moved to Rome, where she took up residence in the Palazzo Salviati.

Ecclesiastical career
To pursue his ecclesiastical career, Cybo went to Rome in 1641, as Domestic Prelate and as a referendary of the Tribunal of the Two Signatures to Pope Urban VIII. 

In 1644 he was appointed master of the Papal Chamber and prefect of the Holy Apostolic Palace.

On 6 March 1645, Cybo was elevated to the rank of cardinal by Pope Innocent X, and named Cardinal-Priest of Santa Pudenziana. In 1646 he was given the office of papal legate (i.e. governor) in Urbino, and in 1648 of papal legate in the Romandiola. In 1651 he became legate in Ferrara.

On 24 April 1656 he was appointed Bishop of Jesi.  The Cardinal held a diocesan synod in Jesi from 4 to 6 July 1658. He resigned the diocese on 10 December 1671, in favor of his brother Lorenzo Cybo. 

In 1677, Cardinal Cybo was appointed papal legate (governor) in Avignon, which was an exclave of the Papal States in France. He held the office until 1690, though he administered his office only through appointees, never visiting personally.

On 6 February 1679 Cybo was appointed suburbicarian Bishop of Palestrina by Pope Innocent XI. He was transferred to the diocese of Tusculum (Frascati) on 8 January 1680. He was promoted to the diocese of Porto e Santa Rufina on 8 January 1680. He became Dean of the College of Cardinals and Bishop of Ostia e Velletri on 10 November 1687.

Cybo participated in the papal conclaves of 1655, 1667, 1669–1670 and 1676. As Dean, he presided over the Papal conclave of 1689 and the conclave of 1691.

Later life and death

In 1676, Cybo was appointed Cardinal Secretary of State by Pope Innocent XI; he held the post until the death of Pope Innocent in 1689. 

In 1698, Cardinal Cybo held a diocesan synod at Velletri on 24 and 25 November. The constitutions of the synod were published.

Cybo died on 22 July 1700 in Rome, and was buried in the Cybo Chapel of the church of Santa Maria del Popolo, which he had radically rebuilt by Carlo Fontana and Carlo Maratta to glorify the achievements of his family.

References

Bibliography

 
Mussi, L. (1913). Il cardinal Alderano dei principi Cybo Malaspina. Massa 1913.

External links
 Stumpo, Enrico (1981). "Cibo, Alderano." Dizionario Biografico degli Italiani Volume 25 (1981) 

1613 births
1700 deaths
18th-century Italian cardinals
Cardinal-bishops of Frascati
Cardinal-bishops of Palestrina
Cardinal Secretaries of State